Clearfield Township is a township in Griggs County, North Dakota, United States.

History
The exact date that Clearfield Township was incorporated is unknown. Pleasant View Township was designated by Congress on February 9, 1888. The township board met on February 23, 1893 and discussed the possibility of dividing Pleasant View into two Townships - Clearfield and Kingsley.  There is no record of any action being taken.  However, on July 9, 1894, it seemed to have been separated and Clearfield Township was in existence.

Demographics
Its population during the 2010 census was 44.

Location within Griggs County
Clearfield Township is located in Township 146 Range 60 west of the Fifth principal meridian.

References

Townships in Griggs County, North Dakota